Dudeney is a surname. Notable people with the surname include:

Alice Dudeney (1866–1945), English writer, wife of Henry
Henry Dudeney (1857–1930), English writer and mathematician
Dudeney number
Leonard Dudeney (1875–1956), English newspaper editor and journalist